Moulding (British English), or molding (American English), also coving (in United Kingdom, Australia), is a strip of material with various profiles used to cover transitions between surfaces or for decoration. It is traditionally made from solid milled wood or plaster, but may be of plastic or reformed wood.  In classical architecture and sculpture, the moulding is often carved in marble or other stones.  In historic architecture, and some expensive modern buildings, it may be formed in place with plaster.

A "plain" moulding has right-angled upper and lower edges. A "sprung" moulding has upper and lower edges that bevel towards its rear,  allowing mounting between two non-parallel planes (such as a wall and a ceiling), with an open space behind. Mouldings may be decorated with paterae as long, uninterrupted elements may be boring for eyes.

Types

 Decorative mouldings have been made of wood, stone and cement. Recently mouldings have been made of extruded PVC and Expanded Polystyrene (EPS) as a core with a cement-based protective coating. Synthetic mouldings are a cost-effective alternative that rival the aesthetic and function of traditional profiles.

Common mouldings include:
 Archivolt: Ornamental moulding or band following the curve on the underside of an arch.
 Astragal: Semi-circular moulding attached to one of a pair of doors to cover the gap where they meet.
 Baguette: Thin, half-round moulding, smaller than an astragal, sometimes carved, and enriched with foliages, pearls, ribbands, laurels, etc. When enriched with ornaments, it was also called chapelet.
 Bandelet: Any little band or flat moulding, which crowns a Doric architrave. It is also called a tenia (from Greek ταινία an article of clothing in the form of a ribbon).
 Baseboard, "base moulding" or "skirting board": Used to conceal the junction of an interior wall and floor, to protect the wall from impacts and to add decorative features. A "speed base" makes use of a base "cap moulding" set on top of a plain 1" thick board, however there are hundreds of baseboard profiles.
 Baton: See Torus
 Batten or board and batten: Symmetrical moulding that is placed across a joint where two parallel panels or boards meet
 Bead moulding: Narrow, half-round convex moulding, when repeated forms reeding 
 Beading or bead:  Moulding in the form of a row of half spherical beads, larger than pearling
Other forms: Bead and leaf, bead and reel, bead and spindle
 Beak:  Small fillet moulding left on the edge of a larmier, which forms a canal, and makes a kind of pendant. See also: chin-beak
 Bed-mould or Bed moulding: Narrow moulding used at the junction of a wall and ceiling, found under the cornice, of which it is a part. Similar to crown moulding, a bed mould is used to cover the joint between the ceiling and wall. Bed moulds can be either sprung or plain, or flush to the wall as an extension of a cornice mould.
 Bolection: Raised moulding projecting proud of a face frame at the intersection of the different levels between the frame and an inset panel on a door or wood panel. It will sometimes have a rabbet on its underside the depth of the lower level so it can lay flat over both.  It can leave an inset panel free to expand or contract with temperature and humidity.
  or ropework: Convex moulding carved in imitation of a twisted rope or cord, and used for decorative mouldings of the Romanesque style in England, France and Spain and adapted for 18th-century silver and furniture design (Thomas Sheraton)
 Cabled fluting or cable: Convex circular moulding sunk in the concave fluting of a classic column, and rising about one-third of the height of the shaft
 Casing: Finish trim around the sides of a door or window opening covering the gap between finished wall and the jam or frame it is attached to.
 Cartouche  escutcheon: Framed panel in the form of a scroll with an inscribed centre, or surrounded by compound mouldings decorated with floral motifs  
 Cavetto:  cavare("to hollow"): Concave, quarter-round moulding sometimes employed in the place of the cymatium of a cornice, as in the Doric order of the Theatre of Marcellus. It forms the crowning feature of Egyptian temples and took the place of the cymatium in many Etruscan temples.
 Chair rail or dado rail: Horizontal moulding placed part way up a wall to protect the surface from chair-backs, and used simply as decoration
 Chamfer: Beveled edge between two adjacent surfaces
 Chin-beak: Concave quarter-round moulding, rare in ancient buildings, more common today.
 Corner guard: Used to protect the edge of the wall at an outside corner, or to cover a joint on an inside corner.
 Cornice: Generally any horizontal decorative moulding
 Cove moulding or coving: Concave-profile moulding that is used at the junction of an interior wall and ceiling
 Crown moulding: Wide, sprung moulding that is used at the junction of an interior wall and ceiling. General term for any moulding at the top or "crowning" an architectural element.

 Cyma: Moulding of double curvature, combining the convex ovolo and concave cavetto. When the concave part is uppermost, it is called a cyma recta but if the convex portion is at the top, it is called a Cyma reversa (See diagram at Ogee.) When crowning moulding at the entablature is of the cyma form, it is called a cymatium.
 Dentils: Small blocks spaced evenly along the bottom edge of the cornice
 : Moulding placed over a door or window opening to prevent water from flowing under the siding or across the glass
 Echinus: Similar to the ovolo moulding and found beneath the abacus of the Doric capital or decorated with the egg-and-dart pattern below the Ionic capital
 Egg-and-dart: egg shapes alternating with V-shapes; one of the most widely used classical mouldings. 
 Also: Egg and tongue, egg and anchor, egg and star
 Fillet: Small, flat band separating two surfaces, or between the flutes of a column. Fillet is also used on handrail applications when the handrail is "plowed" to accept square shaped balusters. The fillet is used on the bottom side of the handrail between each of the balusters.
 Fluting: Vertical, half-round grooves cut into the surface of a column in regular intervals, each separated by a flat astragal. This ornament was used for all but the Tuscan order
 Godroon or Gadroon: Ornamental band with the appearance of beading or reeding, especially frequent in silverwork and moulding. It comes from the Latin , meaning flask. It is said to be derived from raised work on linen, applied in France to varieties of the, bead and reel, in which the bead is often carved with ornament. In England the term is constantly used by auctioneers to describe the raised convex decorations under the bowl of stone or terracotta vases. The godroons radiate from the vertical support of the vase and rise halfway up the bowl.
Also: Gadrooning, lobed decoration, (k)nukked decoration, 
 Guilloché: Interlocking curved bands in a repeating pattern often forming circles enriched with rosettes and found in Assyrian ornament, classical and Renaissance architecture.
  : Sharp-edged moulding resembling a cross-section of a ship's keel, common in the Early English and Decorated styles.
 Lamb's Tongue: Lambs Tongue is a moulding having a deep, symmetrical profile ending in a narrow edge.
 Muntin: Narrow strip of wood or metal separating and holding panes of glass in a window.
 Ogee: see "Cyma"
 Order: Each of a series of mouldings 
 Ovolo: Simple, convex quarter-round moulding that can also be enriched with the egg-and-dart or other pattern 
 
 Panel Mould: A moulding that is flat on the back and profiled on the face. It is applied directly on a flat surface like a wall or flush door in squares or rectangles to simulate a panel. 
 : Functional moulding installed 7–9 feet above the floor from which framed art is hung, common in commercial buildings and homes with plaster walls.
 Rosette: Circular, floral decorative element found in Mesopotamian design and early Greek stele, common in revival styles of architecture since the Renaissance.
 Scotia: Concave moulding with asymetric upper and lower profiles.  When used as a base its lower edge projects beyond the top, as on columns as a transition between two torus mouldings with different diameters; also used with its upper edge projecting on mantels, crown mouldings, and on stairs, supporting their treads' nosing
 Screen moulding: Small moulding used to hide and reinforce where a screen is attached to its frame.
 Shoe moulding, toe moulding or quarter-round: Small flexible moulding used at the junction of a baseboard and floor as a stylistic element or to cover any gap between the two.
 Strapwork: Imitates thick lengths of leather straps applied to a surface to produce pattern of ribs in connected circles, squares, scrolls, lozenges etc. Popular in England in 16th & 17th. centuries, used in plaster on ceilings, also sculpted in stone on exterior of buildings, e.g. around entrance doors. Also carved in wood, and used for topiary designs for parterres. 
 : Convex, semi-circular moulding, larger than an astragal, often at the base of a column, which may be enriched with leaves or plaiting. In the Ionic orders there are generally two torus mouldings separated by a scotia with annulets.
 Trim moulding:  General term used for mouldings used to create added detail or cover up gaps, including corner mouldings, cove mouldings, rope mouldings, quarter rounds, and accent mouldings.

Use

At their simplest, mouldings hide and help weather seal natural joints produced in the framing process of building a structure. As decorative elements, they are a means of applying light- and dark-shaded stripes to a structural object without having to change the material or apply pigments. Depending on their function they may be primarily a means of hiding or weather-sealing a joint, purely decorative, or some combination of the three.

As decorative elements the contrast of dark and light areas gives definition to the object. If a vertical wall is lit at an angle of about 45 degrees above the wall (for example, by the sun) then adding a small overhanging horizontal moulding, called a fillet moulding, will introduce a dark horizontal shadow below it. Adding a vertical fillet to a horizontal surface will create a light vertical shadow. Graded shadows are possible by using mouldings in different shapes: the concave cavetto moulding produces a horizontal shadow that is darker at the top and lighter at the bottom; an ovolo (convex) moulding makes a shadow that is lighter at the top and darker at the bottom. Other varieties of concave moulding are the scotia and congé and other convex mouldings the echinus, the torus and the astragal.

Placing an ovolo directly above a cavetto forms a smooth s-shaped curve with vertical ends that is called an ogee or cyma reversa moulding. Its shadow appears as a band light at the top and bottom but dark in the interior. Similarly, a cavetto above an ovolo forms an s with horizontal ends, called a cyma or cyma recta. Its shadow shows two dark bands with a light interior.

Together the basic elements and their variants form a decorative vocabulary that can be assembled and rearranged in endless combinations. This vocabulary is at the core of both classical architecture and Gothic architecture.

Design

Classical Mouldings 
When practiced in the Classical tradition the combination and arrangement of mouldings are primarily done according to preconceived compositions. Typically, mouldings are rarely improvised by the architect or builder, but rather follows established conventions that define the ratio, geometry, scale, and overall configuration of a moulding course or entablature in proportion to the entire building. Classical mouldings have their roots in ancient civilizations, with examples such the 'cornice cavetto' and 'papyriform columns' appearing in ancient Egyptian architecture, while Greek and Roman practices developed into the highly the regulated classical orders. Necessary to the spread of Classical architecture was the circulation of pattern books, which provided reproducible copies and diagrammatic plans for architects and builders. Works containing sections and ratios of mouldings appear as early as the Roman era with Vitruvius and much later influential publications such as Giacomo Barozzi da Vignola's, Five Orders of Architecture, and James Gibbs's, Rules for Drawing the Several Parts of Architecture. Pattern books can be credited for the regularization and continuity of classical architectural mouldings across countries and continents particularly during the colonial era, contributing to the global occurrence of Classical mouldings and elements. Pattern books remained common currency amongst architects and builders up until the early 20th century, but soon after mostly disappeared as Classical architecture lost favor to Modernist and post-war building practices that conscientiously stripped their buildings of mouldings. However, the study of formalized pattern languages, including mouldings, has since been revived through online resources and the popularity of new classical architecture in the early 21st century.

Gothic Mouldings 
The middle ages are characterized as a period of decline and erosion in the formal knowledge of Classical architectural principles. This eventually resulted in an amateur and 'malformed' use of moulding patterns that eventually development into the complex and inventive Gothic style. While impressive and seemingly articulate across Europe, Gothic architecture remained mostly regional and no comprehensive pattern books were developed at the time, but instead likely circulated through pilgrimage and the migration of trained Gothic masons. These medieval forms were later imitated by prominent Gothic Revivalists such as Augustus Pugin and Eugène Viollet-le-Duc who formalized Gothic mouldings, developing them into its own systematic pattern books which could be replicated by architects with no native Gothic architecture.

See also 

 Ancient Greek architecture
 Ancient Roman architecture
 Architrave
 Baseboard
 Entablature
 Glossary of architecture
 Molding plane
 Renaissance architecture

References

Further reading 
 Theory of Mouldings (Classical America Series in Art and Architecture); C Howard Walker (Author); Richard Sammons (Foreword); W. W. Norton & Co. (July 31, 2007);

External links 
 

Architectural elements
Ceilings
Ornaments (architecture)
Woodworking